The following is a list of events effecting Philippine television in 1990. Events listed include television show debuts, finales, cancellations, and channel launches, closures and rebrandings, as well as information about controversies and carriage disputes.

Events
 March: GMA marks 40 years of broadcasts.

Premieres

Unknown Date
 October:
 Estudyante Blues on PTV 4
 Viva Drama Specials on PTV 4

Unknown
Mag-Asawa'y Di Biro on New Vision 9
Small Brothers on ABS-CBN 2
It Bulingit on ABS-CBN 2
Luv Ko si Kris on ABS-CBN 2
Wala Kang Paki on ABS-CBN 2
Agring-Agri on IBC 13
Look Up with Evelyn Atayde on IBC 13
Mag Agri Tayo on IBC 13
Morning Brew on IBC 13
Kalusugan ay Kayamanan on IBC 13
Mahal on IBC 13
Usap-Usapan Live on IBC 13
24 Oras on IBC 13
Ula ang Batang Gubat on IBC 13
Computerman on IBC 13
Ang Manok Ni San Pedro on IBC 13
Mongolian Barbecue on IBC 13
Takeshi's Castle on IBC 13
TVJ: Television's Jesters on IBC 13
Awitawanan on IBC 13
Chairman and Friends at Faces on IBC 13
Saturday Nite Live on IBC 13
Islands Gamemasters on IBC 13
Concert at the Park on GMA 7
The Penthouse Party on GMA 7
Pandakekoks on GMA 7
Profiles of Power on GMA 7
Negosiete: Mag-Aral sa GMA on GMA 7
Chikiting Patrol on GMA 7
Yan ang Bata on GMA 7
Beauty School with Ricky Reyes on New Vision 9
Boracay on New Vision 9
Gabi ni Dolphy on New Vision 9
Hoy! on New Vision 9
Kami Naman! on New Vision 9
Pedya: TV Day Care on New Vision 9
Rhapsody on New Vision 9
Tanglaw ng Buhay on New Vision 9
T.S.U.P on New Vision 9
Kadenang Rosas on PTV 4
Midnight Session on PTV 4
Pagcor Jai-Alai on PTV 4
Pin Pin on PTV 4
Sa Direksyon ni Lino Brocka on PTV 4
Usapang Kongreso on PTV 4
Yamara! A Fashionable Judo Girl on GMA 7

Programs transferring networks

Finales
February 15: Ang Boyfriend Kong Mamaw (E.T. Pala) on IBC 13
February 17: Unsolved Mysteries on New Vision 9
February 19: Face the Music on New Vision 9
March 15: Princess on GMA 7
July 3: PEP (People, Events and Places) Talk on ABS-CBN 2
June 29: Last Two Minites on PTV 4
July 13: Sa Direksyon ni Lino Brocka on PTV 4
July 30: John en Marsha on New Vision 9
September 15: Sic O'Clock News on IBC 13
September 28: Bantay Balita on IBC 13

Unknown date

Unknown
Student Canteen on New Vision 9
Concert at the Park on PTV 4
ABS-CBN International Report on ABS-CBN 2
Seiko TV Presents on ABS-CBN 2
Ellas A.D. on ABS-CBN 2
Wala Kang Paki on ABS-CBN 2
Cafe Bravo on ABS-CBN 2
Cooking Atbp on ABS-CBN 2
Chikiting Patrol on IBC 13
Look Up with Evelyn Atayde on IBC 13
Mag Agri Tayo on IBC 13
Public Forum on IBC 13
Kalusugan ay Kayamanan on IBC 13
El Corazon de Oro on IBC 13
Ora Engkantada on IBC 13
13, 14, 15 on IBC 13
Takeshi's Castle on IBC 13
Loveliness on IBC 13
Saturday Nite Live on IBC 13
Superstar: The Legend on IBC 13
Beauty School with Ricky Reyes on IBC 13
Pinoy Wrestling on IBC 13
Regal Romance on GMA 7
Pabuenas sa Siete on GMA 7
Velez This Week on GMA 7
Embassy Features on GMA 7
Issues and Answers on GMA 7
Bulilit on GMA 7
John Osteen on GMA 7
Blotter on New Vision 9
Boracay on New Vision 9
Correctionals on New Vision 9
Gabi ni Dolphy on New Vision 9
Kami Naman! on New Vision 9
NewsWatch International on New Vision 9
Pedya: TV Day Care on New Vision 9
Rhapsody on New Vision 9
T.S.U.P on New Vision 9
People's Privilege Hour on PTV 4
Start of Something Big on PTV 4

Births
January 1 - Bugoy Drilon, actor and singer
January 9 – Melissa Ricks, actress
January 14 – Mikee Lee, - actor and dancer
February 13 - Raphael Martinez - actor
February 27 – Megan Young, Filipino-American actress and Miss World 2013 winner
March 24 – Aljur Abrenica, Filipino actor
March 26 - Matteo Guidicelli, actor and singer and TV Host
March 30 - Benjamin de Guzman, actor, dancer, TV Host
April 11, Martin Escudero, actor
April 19 – Kim Chiu, Filipina actress
April 27 – Jackie Rice, Filipino-American actress
May 4 – Andrea Torres, Filipina TV/film actress and commercial model
May 12 - Sherwin Baguion, actor and singer
May 17 - Ronabelle Veneracion, actress and TV Host
May 28 - Josef Elizalde, actor and TV Host
May 31 – Justine Peña, Host of O Shopping 
June 22 – Ani Pearl Alonzo
June 25 – Andi Eigenmann, Filipina actress
June 29 - Jewel Mische, actress and TV Host
June 30 - Nelsito Nel Gomez, actor, dancer and TV Host
July 8 - Olyn Meimban, actress and TV Host
July 10 – Hajji Kaamiño, broadcaster
July 20 – Dominic Roque (Born Dominic Karl Manalo Roque), actor and model
August 10 – Gwen Zamora, Filipina-Italian actress
August 18 - Nicole Uysiuseng, actress and TV Host
August 19 – Debbie Gracia, actress and commercial model
August 30 – Sophie Albert, Filipina actress
September 20 – Erich Gonzales, Filipina actress
September 27 – Charee Pineda, Filipino-American actress
September 29 – Gerphil Flores, Filipina classical singer
October 3 – Rhian Ramos, Filipina actress
October 18 - Beatrice Candaza, actress, model, & TV Host
November 16 – Arjo Atayde, actor
December 10 - Ronan Nan Cleunar, actor and TV Host

References

See also
1990 in television

 
Philippine television-related lists
Television in the Philippines by year